Tan Sağtürk (born 14 July 1969) is a Turkish actor, ballet dancer, and choreographer. His maternal family is of Circassian descent. A graduate of Ballet Department of Hacettepe University Ankara State Conservatory, Sağtürk is a soloist dancer of the Jeune Ballet de France, Ballet National de France, and Istanbul National Opera and Ballet. He is also the eponymous founder of ballet and dance schools in Diyarbakır, Mardin, Gaziantep, Kayseri, Istanbul, Ankara, İzmir, and Northern Cyprus.Also, he played in  fantasy child series "Bez Bebek" and hit series "İkinci Bahar".

References

External links 
Tan Sağtürk Academy Official Website

Turkish male ballet dancers
Turkish people of Circassian descent
Actors from İzmir
1969 births
Ballet choreographers
Living people
Hacettepe University Ankara State Conservatory alumni